Fabián Eduardo Bonhoff Rosas (born 14 August 1963) is an Argentine retired footballer. He played as defender in some clubs in Argentina and Spain.

References

1963 births
Living people
Argentine people of Russian descent
Footballers from Santa Fe, Argentina
Argentine footballers
Association football defenders
Argentine Primera División players
Primera Nacional players
La Liga players
Segunda División players
Newell's Old Boys footballers
Club Atlético Huracán footballers
CD Castellón footballers
Argentine expatriate footballers
Expatriate footballers in Spain